The UEFA Euro 1988 qualifying Group 5 was one of the seven qualifying groups to determine which teams would compete at the UEFA Euro 1988 finals tournament. Group 5 consisted of five teams: Netherlands, Greece, Hungary, Poland, and Cyprus, where they played against each other home-and-away in a round-robin format, with the top team qualifying for the final tournament. The Netherlands won the group and qualified for the finals, finishing five points clear of Greece.

Standings

Matches

Goalscorers

Notes

References

External links
UEFA page
 RSSSF page

Group 5
1986–87 in Polish football
1987–88 in Polish football
1986–87 in Greek football
1987–88 in Greek football
1986–87 in Cypriot football
1987–88 in Cypriot football
1986–87 in Hungarian football
1987–88 in Hungarian football
1986–87 in Dutch football
Qual